Shukrawar Peth Vidhan Sabha seat was one of the seats in Maharashtra Legislative Assembly in India, from 1962 to 1977. It was a segment of Pune Lok Sabha constituency. The Vidhan Sabha seat was made defunct after constituency map of India was redrawn around 1975.

Members of Assembly 
 1962 : Rambhau Vithal Telang (INC)
 1967 : Rambhau Mhalgi (Jana Sangh)  
 1972 : Rambhau Mhalgi (Jana Sangh)  
 1978 onwards : Seat does not exist

Election Results

1962 Assembly Election 
 Rambhau Vithal Telang (INC) 28,434 votes
 Shridhar Mahadev Joshi (PSP) 19,263 votes

1967 Assembly Election 
 R. K. Mhalgi, a.k.a., Rambhau Mhalgi (BJS) 31,265 votes
 B. P. Apte (Congress) 14,146 votes

1972 Assembly Election 
 Ramchandra K. Mhalgi (Jana Sangh) : 41,792 votes
 Vasant Thorat (INC) : 40,195 votes

See also 
 List of constituencies of Maharashtra Legislative Assembly

References 

Former assembly constituencies of Maharashtra